Strollology or Promenadology  is the science of strolling as a method in the field of aesthetics and cultural studies with the aim of becoming aware of the conditions of perception of the environment and enhancement of environmental perception itself.

Based on traditional methods in cultural studies as well as experimental practices like taking reflective walks and aesthetically interventions.

The term and special field of studies was created in the 1980s by the Swiss sociologist Lucius Burckhardt, who, at that time, was a professor at the University of Kassel, as an alternative to the technocratic centrally planned economy.

Books
Why is Landscape Beautiful?: The Science of Strollology

See Also 
Psychogeography

References

External links
 Spaziergangswissenschaft
 Spaziergangswissenschaft in Fortbewegung
 Strollology Berlin
 Walkscapes, strollology, and the politics of promenade
 Lucius Burkhardt: Strollological Observations on Perception of the Environment and the Tasks Facing Our Generation (1996) 

Urban studies and planning terminology
Landscape architecture
Walking
Hiking